Raimo Veikko Vartia (15 January 1937 – 18 December 2018) was a Finnish basketball player. He competed in the men's tournament at the 1964 Summer Olympics.

In addition, Vartia represented Finland in three EuroBasket tournaments (1959, 1961, 1963). Domestically, he won five Finnish championships. Vartia died on 18 December 2018 at 81 years of age.

Sources

References

1937 births
2018 deaths
Finnish men's basketball players
Olympic basketball players of Finland
Basketball players at the 1964 Summer Olympics
Sportspeople from Helsinki
Point guards